The Abrams House is a historic house located in Little Rock, Arkansas.

Description and history 
It is a single-story, timber-framed structure, with asymmetrical massing typical of the Queen Anne period and porch detailing with Colonial Revival features. It has a cross-gable plan, with the porch wrapping around two sides, with wide bands of trim and four Doric columns. Built in 1904, it is one of the few surviving houses from a period when the immediate area (near the Arkansas State Capitol) was lined with the houses of railroad employees.

The house was listed on the National Register of Historic Places on February 18, 1999.

See also
National Register of Historic Places listings in Little Rock, Arkansas

References

Houses on the National Register of Historic Places in Arkansas
Colonial Revival architecture in Arkansas
Houses completed in 1904
Houses in Little Rock, Arkansas
National Register of Historic Places in Little Rock, Arkansas
1904 establishments in Arkansas